Egypt–Ethiopia relations are the bilateral relations between the governments of Egypt and Ethiopia. Both countries established diplomatic ties in 1927 to be the oldest on the African continent and one of the oldest in the world. They are both members of the African Union, Nile Basin Initiative and share a relation of special nature due to their crucial roles in vital issues such as the Nile water file and the interest both share on establishing security in the Horn of Africa region by combating terrorism and piracy. In 2021, Ethiopia closed its embassy in Cairo due to financial reasons. In November 2022, Ethiopia reopened its embassy in Cairo.

History 

The first contact between the two people dates back nearly seven thousand years ago when the ancient Egyptians launched their earliest recorded expedition to the Land of Punt under Sahure of the Fifth Dynasty although Punt gold dates back to even earlier times during the rule of King Khufu of the Fourth Dynasty. Ancient Egyptians called this place Ta-neter (The Gods' Land) and viewed it as a mysterious and unknown land of great fortune. They frequently engaged in trade expeditions with their partners in Punt where they acquired gold, incense, ebony, ivory, slaves, exotic animals and skins.

Egypt under the Muhammad Ali Pasha dynasty attempted to modernize and form an Egyptian empire, engaging in many wars, against the Ottomans, the Sudanese and others. In the 1870s, Egypt invaded Ethiopia resulting in an Ethiopian victory in the resulting Hewett Treaty.

Relations eventually cooled down, and in 1905, Ethiopia first bank was founded in Cairo. During the Second Italian invasion of Ethiopia, Egyptians sympathized with Ethiopia. The Egyptian Red Cross was sent to Ethiopia, while Egyptians denounced the Italian invasion. 

After World War II, where Egypt and Ethiopia fought for the Allies, Egypt and Ethiopia were founding members of the United Nations. After the 1952 Egyptian revolution, Egypt's pro-British monarchy was replaced with a military junta, eventually consolidating under Gamal Abdel Nasser. As Afrians nations that suffered under colonialism, revolutionary anti-colonialism post World War II led to both states attending the Bandung Conference, a meeting from newly independent African and Asian states. Ethiopia and Egypt were founding members of the Organization of African Unity in 1963. Ethiopian Emperor Haile Salassie visited Cairo in 1959 and 1970.

Two major events in these countries led to a major deterioration in relations. The Ethiopian revolution overthrow the Salassie government and replaced it with a sociaist government ruled by the DERG, and the Corrective Revolution in Egypt, a period of anti-Nasserist purges and the change in Egyptian foreign policy towards the West during the Cold War led by Egyptian president Anwar Sadat. Egypt joined the Safari Club, a clandestine network of anti-communist intellgence services during the Cold War. Egypt coverty supported Somalia during the Ogaden War, a war between Somalia and Ethiopia over the Ogaden region.

Sadat's successor, Hosni Mubarak, sought to repair ties with Ethiopia. Egypt promises neutrality in the Ethiopian civil war

Religious ties 
Religion plays a crucial role in bringing the two countries closer as the Ethiopian Orthodox Tewahedo Church was under the administration of the Coptic Orthodox Church until 1959, when it was appointed its own Patriarch by the Coptic Orthodox Pope of Alexandria and Patriarch of All Africa, Cyril VI. Ethiopian Muslims are also closely attached to Al-Azhar in Cairo, where they have their own column to study under, named Al-Jabarta Column, under which numerous scholars studied such as Shaykh Abdurahman al-Jabarti.

Economic ties 

In 1905, the National Bank of Egypt helped establish Ethiopia's first ever bank, “The Bank of Abyssinia” which operated as an affiliate of the NBE, it received a 50-year monopoly and was the Ethiopian government’s fiscal agent as well as the sole issuer of notes and was responsible for collecting deposits and granting loans as well as trading in gold and silver, stockpiling staple commodities and investments. In a sense, it operated as both a central and a commercial bank until 1930 when it was handed over to the Ethiopian government after Haile Selassie's ascension to the throne who could not accept that the country's issuing bank was foreign-owned. A new government-controlled bank, the Bank of Ethiopia, was installed in 1931 and kept management and almost all staff, premises and clients of the old bank until the Italian invasion in 1936 when it was liquidated.

Today, there are over 72 Egyptian investments projects in Ethiopia in the fields of agriculture, livestock production, industry, tourism and real estate. Another project under implementation is an Egyptian industrial zone in the city of Adama, about 90 km from the capital Addis Ababa. Also, the Arab Contractors company opened an office in the country. Below is statistical data showing the significant development of trade between the two countries between 2007 and 2009 in million US dollars of value:

Nile water 

In 1929, a British-sponsored treaty between Egypt and some Nile basin colonies, without the participation of Ethiopia, awarded Egypt the right to veto any project that it deems threatening to its water share. Ethiopia's control over the Blue Nile has been a cause for concern in recent times. Recently, however, Ethiopia announced the Grand Ethiopian Renaissance Dam (GERD) project, which would allow it to better exploit its water resources, rejecting the old treaty and stressing that it wasn't a member back then. According to the Egyptian authorities, the dam, if built, would negatively affect Egypt's water share, estimated at 57 percent of the Nile waters. Ethiopia turned down several requests from Egypt to pause the construction, furthering tensions between the two countries. The resulting dispute over the GERD has soured recent relations, with Egypt threatning war over Ethiopia.

References

Notes

Bibliography

Further reading 
 Foreign Ministry asks Ethiopia about Egyptians detained in Mubarak assassination attempt | Egypt Independent
 Egypt and Ethiopia vow to defuse Blue Nile dam row. BBC News.
 Nile Basin countries experts negotiation in Khartoum marked with disputes | Egypt Independent
 Ethiopia determined to construct Renaissance Dam: ambassador | Egypt Independent
 Ethiopian dam project to include Egypt and Sudan | Egypt Independent
 Minister: Diversion of Blue Nile no indication that Egypt approves of dam | Egypt Independent
 Foreign Ministry officials discuss Renaissance Dam crisis | Egypt Independent
 Qandil, acting pope to attend Zenawi’s funeral | Egypt Independent
 Qandil visits Ethiopia to offer condolences on Zenawi’s death | Egypt Independent